The Algerian Basketball Federation (FABB) is the governing body of basketball in Algeria. Formed in 1963, it is based in the capital town Algiers. The FABB is a member of the International Basketball Federation (FIBA) and also belong to the FIBA Africa zone. The current president of the federation is Rabah Bouarifi.

Presidents

See also
Algeria national basketball team
Algeria women's national basketball team
Algeria national under-19 basketball team
Algeria national under-17 basketball team
Algeria women's national under-19 basketball team
Algeria women's national under-17 basketball team
Algerian Basketball Cup

References

External links
 Official website  

 

Basketball
Federation
Sports organizations established in 1963
1963 establishments in Algeria
National members of FIBA Africa